German submarine U-975 was a Type VIIC U-boat of Nazi Germany's Kriegsmarine during World War II.

She was ordered on 5 June 1941, and was laid down on 10 July 1942 at Blohm & Voss, Hamburg, as yard number 175. She was launched on 24 March 1943 and commissioned under the command of Oberleutnant zur See Hans-Joachim Ebersbach on 29 April 1943.

Design
German Type VIIC submarines were preceded by the shorter Type VIIB submarines. U-975 had a displacement of  when at the surface and  while submerged. She had two shafts and two  propellers.

U-975 was fitted with five  torpedo tubes (four fitted at the bow and one at the stern), fourteen torpedoes or 26 TMA mines, one  SK C/35 naval gun, 220 rounds, and one twin  C/30 anti-aircraft gun. The boat had a complement of between 44 — 52 men.

Service history
On 9 May 1945, U-975 surrendered at Horten, Norway. She was later transferred to Lisahally, Northern Ireland on 27 May 1945. Of the 156 U-boats that eventually surrendered to the Allied forces at the end of the war, U-975 was one of 116 selected to take part in Operation Deadlight. U-975 was towed out on 10 February 1946, and sunk by the British frigate .

References

Bibliography

External links

German Type VIIC submarines
U-boats commissioned in 1943
World War II submarines of Germany
Ships built in Hamburg
1943 ships
Maritime incidents in 1946
World War II shipwrecks in the Atlantic Ocean
Operation Deadlight